Harmony Township is one of six townships in Union County, Indiana, United States. As of the 2010 census, its population was 543 and it contained 233 housing units.

Geography

Unincorporated towns
 Quakertown at 
(This list is based on USGS data and may include former settlements.)

Adjacent townships
 Liberty Township (north)
 Union Township (east)
 Bath Township, Franklin County (southeast)
 Fairfield Township, Franklin County (south)
 Blooming Grove Township, Franklin County (southwest)
 Jackson Township, Fayette County (west)
 Jennings Township, Fayette County (northwest)

Cemeteries
The township contains these two cemeteries: New Hope and Old Bath Springs.

School districts
 Union County-College Corner Joint School District

Political districts
 Indiana's 6th congressional district
 State House District 55
 State Senate District 43

References
 United States Census Bureau 2007 TIGER/Line Shapefiles
 United States Board on Geographic Names (GNIS)
 IndianaMap

External links
 Indiana Township Association
 United Township Association of Indiana

Townships in Union County, Indiana
Townships in Indiana